Verdigris Township may refer to the following places in the United States:

Verdigris Township, Wilson County, Kansas
Verdigris Township, Antelope County, Nebraska
Verdigris Township, Holt County, Nebraska
Verdigris Township, Rogers County, Oklahoma

See also
Verdigris (disambiguation)

Township name disambiguation pages